Stade d'Issia is a multi-use stadium in Issia, Côte d'Ivoire. It is currently used mostly for football matches and it also has facilities for athletics and was Côte d'Ivoire Premier Division, also was part of CAF Confederation Cup 2008. The stadium is the home place from Issia Wazi.

External links
 Stadion Profile

Athletics (track and field) venues in Ivory Coast
Football venues in Ivory Coast
Côte d'Ivoire
Buildings and structures in Sassandra-Marahoué District
Haut-Sassandra